Bara Dih, also spelled Baradih, is a village in Salon block of Rae Bareli district, Uttar Pradesh, India. It is located 3 km northwest of Salon, the block headquarters, close to the point where the Chob stream joins the Sai river. As of 2011, Bara Dih has a population of 2,248 people, in 386 households.

The 1961 census recorded Bara Dih as comprising 7 hamlets, with a total population of 894 people (480 male and 414 female), in 179 households and 173 physical houses. The area of the village was given as 1,177 acres and it had a post office at that point.

The 1981 census recorded Bara Dih (as "Baradeeh") as having a population of 1,330 people, in 309 households, and having an area of 442.73 hectares. The main staple foods were given as wheat and rice.

References

Villages in Raebareli district